Bolotoperla is a genus of winter stoneflies in the family Taeniopterygidae. There is one described species in Bolotoperla, B. rossi.

References

Further reading

 
 

Taeniopterygidae
Articles created by Qbugbot